The Oklahoma State Capitol is the house of government of the U.S. state of Oklahoma. It is the building that houses the Oklahoma Legislature and executive branch offices. It is located along Lincoln Boulevard in Oklahoma City and contains 452,508 square feet of floor area. The present structure includes a dome completed in 2002.

Oklahoma's first capital was Guthrie, Oklahoma, but it moved to Oklahoma City in 1910. Construction began on the Oklahoma State Capitol in 1914 and was completed in 1917. Originally, it housed the judicial branch of Oklahoma, but the state's high courts moved most of their operations to the Oklahoma Judicial Center in 2011, leaving only the Supreme Court Hearing Chamber in the capitol building.

The state capitol complex is the only state capitol grounds in the United States with active oil rigs.

History

Early capital of Guthrie (1889–1900)
Oklahoma's territorial capital and first state capital was located in the city of Guthrie. The settlement of the first state capital began at noon on April 22, 1889, when cannons sounded the start of the Oklahoma land run. The town was designated as the territorial capital in 1890.

Move to Oklahoma City and construction (1910–1917)
State government officials let voters decide on whether or not to move the capital to Oklahoma City.  On June 11, 1910, the state seal was taken from Guthrie and moved south to Oklahoma City, where the Oklahoma State Capitol is located today.  Lee Cruce, the second Governor of Oklahoma, commissioned the architectural construction of the present day structure.  Prior to its construction, state government offices were housed in the Huckins Hotel in downtown Oklahoma City.

Construction on the Oklahoma State Capitol began after a groundbreaking ceremony on July 20, 1914. Architects Soloman Andrew Layton and S. Wemyss-Smith were paid $75,000 to develop the architectural plans, while James Stewart & Company received the construction contract.

The building's exterior is constructed mainly of Indiana limestone, with a base of local Oklahoma pink granite, and Oklahoma black granite for the grand staircase. The interior prominently features marble as well as fixtures from a variety of sources. While original plans called for a dome, it was omitted due to cost overruns discovered in 1915 when the original $1.5 million appropriated by the Oklahoma Legislature proved insufficient. The building was, however, designed to support a dome.

The building was completed on June 30, 1917.

Earthquake damage
In 1952, a 5.5-magnitude earthquake near El Reno caused several cracks to materialize in walls and ceilings of the Capitol, including one crack measuring about 50 feet in length.

Expansion and change (1998–present)
In 1998, state legislators and the governor enacted legislation to create the Oklahoma Centennial Act, which formed the Oklahoma Capitol Complex and Centennial Commemoration Commission. The commission worked to fund a dome, which was in the initial plans in 1914, for the Oklahoma State Capitol and construction of the dome began in 2001 and was completed in 2002.  It included a  bronze sculpture called The Guardian.  During exterior restoration work in 2014, engineers discovered significant cracks in the precast panels that comprise the dome, but not in any of the supports, contrary to what some think.  The building was designed and built to support the dome.  When the Layton and Smith firm (the firm selected to design the building) presented its preliminary drawings to the commission in 1914, the plans did not include a dome. However, the building was designed to allow for a weighty dome to adorn the central square rotunda. The original commission was split on the desirability of the dome due to the high cost, and as completed, the capitol was not domed

In 2006, plans were made to move the judicial branch into the old Oklahoma Historical Society building, as the agency was moving into the Oklahoma History Center. The court offices moved to the new Oklahoma Judicial Center in 2011.

Ten Commandments Monument controversy

Exterior and Capitol complex

The Oklahoma State Capitol, located at 2300 North Lincoln Boulevard, Oklahoma City is composed primarily of white limestone and Oklahoma pink granite. However, the building's dome is made of steel-reinforced concrete and reinforced plaster casts.

The state capitol complex is famous for its oil wells and remains the only state capitol grounds in the United States with active oil rigs. The capitol building is directly atop the Oklahoma City Oil Field.

The state capitol building and the surrounding government buildings, non-government agencies, museums, libraries, and tree lined streets and boulevards form the Oklahoma State Capitol Complex or Capitol Campus. The complex includes the State Capitol Park, the Oklahoma History Center, the Oklahoma Judicial Center, and the Oklahoma Governor's Mansion. The  mansion has a limestone exterior to complement the Oklahoma State Capitol's exterior. The surrounding neighborhood is home to numerous restaurants and bars.

The Oklahoma History Center opened in 2005 and is operated by the Oklahoma Historical Society. It preserves the history of Oklahoma from prehistoric Native American tribes to the present day.

Interior
The west wing of the Capitol houses the Oklahoma House of Representatives chamber and offices. The east wing houses 
the Oklahoma Senate chamber and offices. The ceremonial office of the governor is located on the second floor. Elected state officials such as the state auditor and inspector, state treasurer, and state attorney general have offices on the first floor. The building also contains a museum, a cafeteria, and a barber shop.

Art

Chickasaw artist Mike Larsen's mural Flight of Spirit, honoring the Five Moons, notable 20th-century Native American ballerinas from Oklahoma is on display in the Capitol rotunda. Several large paintings by Wayne Cooper are on display in the building. Many of them depict the early heritage and oil history of the state. Seminole artist Enoch Kelly Haney's painting The Earth and I are One is on display on the first floor of the building.

The Senate lobby includes a  oil-on-canvas painting of the Ceremonial Transfer of the Louisiana Purchase in New Orleans - 1803 by Mike Wimmer. The Senate Lounge displays a watercolor painting entitled Community of Boling Springs by Sonya Terpening.

The "Ring of Honor"
The base of the Capitol dome is decorated, in six-inch gold letters, with the names of donors who contributed at least $1 million to the dome's construction, referred to as "the ring of honor", a concept usually limited to the most prominent players on professional football teams. Donors so named include Halliburton, Hobby Lobby Stores, "the People of Oklahoma", and General Motors. This design decision attracted some criticism at the time, and in 2011 state representative Eric Proctor attempted to pass legislation replacing the names with those of Oklahomans who had received the Congressional Medal of Honor.

Gallery

See also 

As Long as the Waters Flow
List of state and territorial capitols in the United States
List of National Historic Landmarks in Oklahoma
List of tallest buildings in Oklahoma City
History of Oklahoma
History of Oklahoma City
Government of Oklahoma
Chickasaw Nation Capitols
Choctaw Capitol Building

References

External links 

Oklahoma State website
Voices of Oklahoma interview with Charles Ford. First person interview conducted on August 3, 2010 with Charles Ford talking about the historical significance of the Senate Collection at the Oklahoma State Capitol. Original audio and transcript archived with Voices of Oklahoma oral history project.

Buildings and structures in Oklahoma City
Government of Oklahoma
State capitols in the United States
Government buildings with domes
1917 establishments in Oklahoma
Capitol
Government buildings on the National Register of Historic Places in Oklahoma
Tourist attractions along U.S. Route 66
Government buildings in Oklahoma
Tourist attractions in Oklahoma City
National Register of Historic Places in Oklahoma City